The Marmara barbel (Barbus oligolepis) is a species of cyprinid fish endemic to Turkey where it is only known from fast flowing waters with substrates of stones or pebbles.  This species can reach a length of  SL.

Taxonomic issue
Oliotius oligolepis (Bleeker, 1853), a species of barb from Southeast Asia has at times been placed in the genus Barbus which would render the current species invalid as a junior homonym.  However, since Bleeker's oligolepis species, originally in Capoeta, is currently placed in the genus Oliotius and before that in Puntius, Battalgil's oligolepis species is available and valid.

References 

oligolepis
Fish described in 1941